Dusty Mike Rychart (born August 11, 1978) is an Australian-American professional basketball player for the Brisbane Capitals of the Queensland Basketball League (QBL).

College career
Rychart attended the University of Minnesota in Minneapolis where he walked on to the basketball team for the 1997–98 season. After redshirting his freshman year, Rychart became the backbone of the Minnesota Gophers for four seasons. While not considered flashy or high profile, Rychart was a workhorse, withstanding an academic scandal, a coaching change, sanctions, numerous players coming and going, but still managed to come out on top. As a senior in 2001–02, he earned third-team All-Big Ten honors. In 111 career games over four years, Rychart averaged 11.4 points, 6.6 rebounds and 1.5 assists per game.

Professional career
After going undrafted in the 2002 NBA draft, Rychart joined the Minnesota Timberwolves NBA Summer League team. He later moved to Australia and joined the Victoria Giants for the 2002–03 NBL season. However, in December 2002, he parted ways the Giants and moved to the Adelaide 36ers the following month, signing for the rest of the season. He made his debut for the 36ers on January 29, 2003, and continued on with Adelaide for a further three seasons, recording his best season in 2004–05 with averages of 21.4 points and 10.8 rebounds per game. During the Australian NBL off-season in 2005, Rychart played for the Hawke's Bay Hawks of the New Zealand NBL.

In March 2006, Rychart signed a two-year deal with the Brisbane Bullets. In his first year as a Bullet, he became a championship player after Brisbane defeated the Melbourne Tigers in the grand final series. During the 2007 off-season, he played for the North Adelaide Rockets where he was awarded the Woollacott Medal and earned Central ABL All-Star Five honors, a season in which he helped the Rockets win the Central ABL championship.

Following the 2007–08 season, the Bullets disbanded, leaving Rychart without a team. After a stint in the QBL with the Brisbane Capitals, the Wollongong Hawks nabbed him in July 2008 and signed him up for one season.

After gaining Australia citizenship in June 2009, Rychart moved north and signed with the Cairns Taipans as a local. After two productive seasons in Cairns, injuries began to tarnish Rychart's decorative NBL career as he stumbled through the 2011–12 and 2012–13 seasons, managing just 29 games over his last two seasons. In 309 career NBL games, he averaged 15.1 points, 8.0 rebounds and 1.6 assists per game.

After returning to the QBL in 2012 with the Cairns Marlins, Rychart re-joined the Brisbane Capitals in 2013 and earned All-League honors for the first time. He returned to the Capitals in 2014 and averaged 16.8 points and a career-high 13.1 rebounds per game. His 2015 season saw his points production decrease as the Capitals made it back to the playoffs as the No. 2 seed. Rychart continued on with the Capitals in 2016 and 2017. Rychart was ruled out of the entire 2018 season with a knee injury.

References

External links
Rychart's official website
MVP Sports player profile

1978 births
Living people
Adelaide 36ers players
American emigrants to Australia
American expatriate basketball people in Australia
American expatriate basketball people in New Zealand
American expatriate basketball people in Slovenia
Australian men's basketball players
Basketball players from Minnesota
Brisbane Bullets players
Cairns Taipans players
Hawke's Bay Hawks players
Minnesota Golden Gophers men's basketball players
Naturalised citizens of Australia
People from Grand Rapids, Minnesota
Victoria Giants players
American men's basketball players
Centers (basketball)
Power forwards (basketball)